The following is a glossary of traditional English-language terms used in the three overarching cue sports disciplines: carom billiards referring to the various  games played on a billiard table without ; pool, which denotes a host of games played on a table with six pockets; and snooker, played on a large pocket table, and which has a sport culture unto itself distinct from pool. There are also games such as English billiards that include aspects of multiple disciplines.

Definitions and language
The term "" is sometimes used to refer to all of the cue sports, to a specific class of them, or to specific ones such as English billiards; this article uses the term in its most generic sense unless otherwise noted.

The labels "British" and "UK" as applied to entries in this glossary refer to terms originating in the UK and also used in countries that were fairly recently part of the British Empire and/or are part of the Commonwealth of Nations, as opposed to US (and, often, Canadian) terminology. The terms "American" or "US" as applied here refer generally to North American usage. However, due to the predominance of US-originating terminology in most internationally competitive pool (as opposed to snooker), US terms are also common in the pool context in other countries in which English is at least a minority language, and US (and borrowed French) terms predominate in carom billiards. Similarly, British terms predominate in the world of snooker, English billiards, and blackball, regardless of the players' nationalities.

The term "blackball" is used in this glossary to refer to both blackball and eight-ball pool as played in the UK, as a shorthand. Blackball was chosen because it is less ambiguous ("eight-ball pool" is too easily confused with the international standardized "eight-ball"), and blackball is globally standardized by an International Olympic Committee-recognized governing body, the World Pool-Billiard Association (WPA); meanwhile, its ancestor, eight-ball pool, is largely a folk game, like North American , and to the extent that its rules have been codified, they have been done so by competing authorities with different rulesets. (For the same reason, the glossary's information on eight-ball, nine-ball, and ten-ball draws principally on the stable WPA rules, because there are many competing amateur leagues and even professional tours with divergent rules for these games.)

Foreign-language terms are generally not within the scope of this list, unless they have become an integral part of billiards terminology in English (e.g. ), or they are crucial to meaningful discussion of a game not widely known in the English-speaking world.

1–9

A

Also Parker's box.

B

C

D

E

F

G

H

I

J

K

L

M

N

O

P

Q

R

S

T

U

V

W

Y

Z

References

Glossary
Glossaries of sports
Sports terminology
Game terminology
Glossary
 
Articles containing video clips
Cue sports related lists
Wikipedia glossaries using description lists
Wikipedia glossaries using unordered lists